The men's high jump at the 1952 Olympic Games took place on 20 July at the Helsinki Olympic Stadium. Thirty-six athletes from 24 nations competed. The maximum number of athletes per nation had been set at 3 since the 1930 Olympic Congress. American athlete Walt Davis won the gold medal and set a new Olympic record. It was the Americans' 10th victory in the men's high jump. José da Conceição won Brazil's first medal in the men's high jump, with bronze.

Background

This was the 12th appearance of the event, which is one of 12 athletics events to have been held at every Summer Olympics. The returning finalists from the 1948 Games were fifth-place finisher Georges Damitio of France, seventh-place finishers Alan Paterson of Great Britain and Hans Wahli of Switzerland, thirteenth-place finisher Birger Leirud of Norway, fourteenth-place finisher Hércules Azcune of Uruguay, and nineteenth-place finisher Bjørn Gundersen of Norway. The "heavy favorite" in 1952 was Walt Davis.

Ceylon, Egypt, Ghana, Indonesia, Israel, Nigeria, the Soviet Union, and Venezuela each made their debut in the event. The United States appeared for the 12th time, having competed at each edition of the Olympic men's high jump to that point.

Competition format

The competition used the two-round format introduced in 1912. There were two distinct rounds of jumping with results cleared between rounds. The qualifying round had the bar set at 1.70 metres, 1.80 metres, 1.84 metres, and 1.87 metres; some jumpers apparently took jumps at lower heights as well. All jumpers clearing 1.87 metres in the qualifying round advanced to the final. The final had jumps at 1.70 metres (which most finalists skipped), 1.80 metres, 1.90 metres, 1.95 metres, 1.98 metres, 2.01 metres, 2.04 metres, and 2.07 metres. Each athlete had three attempts at each height.

Records

Prior to this competition, the existing world and Olympic records were as follows.

Walt Davis cleared 2.04 metres to break the Olympic record. His attempts at 2.07 metres were unsuccessful.

Schedule

All times are Eastern European Summer Time (UTC+3)

Results

Qualifying round

Qualification Criteria:	Qualifying Performance 1.87 advance to the Final.

Final

The final was held on July 20.

References

External links
Official Olympic Report, la84.org.

Athletics at the 1952 Summer Olympics
High jump at the Olympics
Men's events at the 1952 Summer Olympics